Cool Cymru was a Welsh cultural movement in music and independent film in the 1990s and 2000s, led by the popularity of bands such as Stereophonics, Gorky's Zygotic Mynci, Manic Street Preachers, Catatonia and Super Furry Animals.

Etymology and usage 
The term Cool Cymru (Cymru is the Welsh name for Wales) derived as a Welsh alternative to Cool Britannia (itself a pun on the British patriotic song "Rule, Britannia!"). Cool Britannia described the revival of British art and culture in the 1990s, the term captured the cultural renaissance centred on London (as celebrated in a 1996 Newsweek magazine cover headlined "London Rules"), emphasised British culture and used British symbols such as The Union Jack.

By 1998 many Welsh cultural figures were gaining prominence within the UK, at the same time the use of the term Cool Britannia had become maligned by some cultural commentators as a ubiquitous term for any part of British Culture. As such the term Cool Cymru gained popularity for the cultural figures and phenomena which were specifically Welsh or Welsh in origin. The term continues to be used by Welsh and British commentators long after the term Cool Britannia has fallen out of favour.

Socio-political context

Background 
Commentators have alluded to Cool Britannia and Cymru as a by-product of the widespread 1970s economic and social malaise seen in the United Kingdom, particularly affecting Wales following the closure of the South Wales Coalfield, and the Winter of Discontent. The South Wales Valleys had seen economic deprivation following the downturn, leading to high unemployment and social discontent.

The 1980s however brought initial optimism, with the Big Bang, and this was cemented by the 1997 election of the New Labour class led by Tony Blair. The Labour Party won a landslide election and positioned itself near to political devolution for Wales and Scotland, and a PR campaign which involved association with the UK arts scene and social engagement with figures in the Britpop movement such as Noel Gallagher. However some have debated whether Labour were merely positioning themselves to benefit from the popularity of the arts, rather than supporting it, and some have instead referred to how Conservative Party politicians instead were the first to refer to the notion of 'Cool Britannia'.

Welsh identity 
Author Iain Ellis attributes some of the attitude behind Cool Cymru figures to the perception that Wales had, for much of the 1960s and 1970s, been 'perennial underachievers' of the Union, stuck with "old-fashioned crooners" like Shirley Bassey and Tom Jones while England was represented across the globe by Beatlemania, The Rolling Stones, and The Who.

Ellis describes how "Scotland and Northern Ireland awoke to the call of punk, post-punk, and indie rock", from international names like Primal Scream, Average White Band, the Bay City Rollers in Scotland; and The Undertones and Van Morrison in Northern Ireland.

In contrast he describes how Wales had "a largely barren rock history". This perceived inadequacy, Ellis argues, spurred the rebellious and unconventional direction of pioneers like Cerys Matthews and Richey Edwards.

Wider political developments had taken to the fore in the 1990s, such as S4C taking a widened remit in the Broadcasting Act 1990, commercial sponsorship of the National Eisteddfod of Wales reaching over £1 million for the first time ever, the construction of the Millennium Stadium, the redevelopment of Cardiff Bay, the establishment of Newport Riverfront Arts Centre, and the wider political and architectural construction which followed the 1997 Welsh devolution referendum. First Minister Rhodri Morgan was also a keen advocate for the Welsh arts.

Wider culture 

Wales in the 1990s was enjoying a particular period of international prominence. Its reputation was heightened by the performances of sporting individuals such as Joe Calzaghe, Ryan Giggs, and Scott Gibbs, as well as the notorious headlines generated by figures like Howard Marks.

Actors of prominence included Ioan Gruffudd, who appeared in Solomon & Gaenor (nominated for Best Foreign Language Film at the 72nd Academy Awards), as well as Rhys Ifans and Anthony Hopkins who both appeared in the Chekhov tale August, and Llangefni born Huw Garmon who starred in the Oscar nominated Welsh language film Hedd Wyn.

1997 saw the release of House of America (about a dysfunctional family in a Welsh mining town), and that same year Newport-born director Julian Richards released Darklands (the "first home grown Welsh horror film").

A particular figure of the era was the Kevin Allen produced black comedy Twin Town which holds cult status in Swansea and internationally. It showed Wales' second city in a then-controversial light of "excessive profanity, drug-taking and violence as the order of the day", and provoked the outraged response of Liberal Democrat MP David Alton who railed against the show as "sordid and squalid, plunging new depths of depravity."

The era is represented in the 1999 coming of age independent film Human Traffic which was hailed for its provocative social commentary and the use of archival footage to provide political commentary while depicting the club scene and drug-fuelled weekends of young people in Cardiff.

The Guardian in a 2004 review of Cool Cymru described a road map of the scene as a "proud nation of footballer Ryan Giggs, movie star Catherine Zeta-Jones, clothes designer Julien Macdonald, rappers Goldie Lookin Chain and, to a lesser extent, Rhys Ifans and Huw Edwards."

Cool Cymru exhibit 

Llanelli born photographer and artist Terry Morris was close to events and figures in the era, and as a result managed to document much of the decade. His book and exhibit was titled Cool Cymru, launched at the Wales Millennium Centre and opened by Charlotte Church. The series later became a three part television documentary by Llanelli-based Tinopolis.

Music culture

Conscious and unconscious Welsh-ness 
Iain Ellis describes his interpretation of Welsh music developments of the era as forming two "poles":

Self consciously Welsh Acts

To Ellis, Super Furry Animals, Gorky's Zygotic Mynci, and Catatonia were "ambitious beyond their borders", yet "asserted national identity by integrating Welsh language songs into their repertoire".

Neither eschewing nor celebrating Welsh Acts

In contrast stood Manic Street Preachers, Stereophonics, and Mclusky, who "saw its identity more through musical genre than geography. Neither eschewing nor overtly celebrating their Welsh roots, these bands implicitly looked beyond their borders, indeed any borders."

Stereophonics 
The Stereophonics' debut album, Word Gets Around, was released in 1997, and the band drew attention when they became the first to sign for Richard Branson's V2 Records. The album went on to receive acclaim, with its asking of potent questions for 1990s young people in Wales, including the line from Traffic:"Is anyone going anywhere?

Everyone’s got to be somewhere."

Stereophonics - "Traffic"Tackling the topic of youth unemployment was also a focus of the era:"I don’t live to work,

I work to live,

I live at the weekend."

Stereophonics - "Last of the Big Time Drinkers"

Writer Griffin Kaye described Stereophonics as "proud, unapologetic Welshmen who serve as the anchormen of the Cool Cymru sound, helping carry the sound from one generation to the next."

Super Furry Animals 
Ellis describes Gruff Rhys' psychedelia driven art as "the heart and soul of the "Cool Cymru" movement", yet he acknowledges it was the act's resonance with the "London-based Britpop movement and its attendant media" which helped its growth, thanks to their dissonance with the more standardised acts of the era such as Oasis. The group famously reached number 11 in the UK charts in 2001, to much surprise given the presence of a full ten Welsh language songs on the album.

Welsh Music Foundation 
Pooh Sticks lead singer Huw Williams, who helped raise the profiles of 60 ft Dolls and Catatonia, co-founded the Welsh Music Foundation, a now defunct Government supported organisation which in the Cool Cymru era was praised for raising the profile of Welsh music internationally and at home. The organisation is credited with individual successes such as the growth of Lostprophets and Mclusky, as well as bringing BBC Radio 1 on its first visit to Wales for Sound City in Cardiff.

Cool Cymru revival 

Amid the growth of Welsh Language Music Day, Horizons Gorwelion, Sŵn Festival, Tafwyl, and the wider proliferation of contemporary independent Welsh musicians, the BBC has asked whether Cool Cymru is back. Huw Stephens addressed the idea in his BBC Radio 4 programme, Cymru Rising.

Sport

Colin Jackson 

Throughout the 1990s Colin Jackson became one of Great Britain's most successful athletes, but was also notable for waving the Welsh flag after every win for Great Britain. Jackson would later acknowledge that he had become more aware of his identity due to Anti-Welsh sentiment during this period, stating "I felt the discrimination was because I was Welsh more than anything else."

Jackson's success and open pride in being Welsh saw him idolized in Wales, and he became an early icon of Cool Cymru, with Jackson winning BBC Wales Sports Personality of the Year three times and being invited to present the Best British Group Award to fellow Welshmen, The Manic Street Preachers at the 1997 Brit Awards.

Rugby Union 

Rugby had long been Wales' national sport and was seen as a "cultural signifier", with the Welsh team's fortunes often reflecting the economic and cultural vagaries of the nation itself. As such, the 1980s and early 1990s were a difficult time for both Welsh rugby and the nation at large. The harsh economic realities were reflected in many Welsh players (such as Jonathan Davies, Scott Quinnell and Scott Gibbs leaving the nation to 'go North' and play Rugby League. It was at the height of Cool Cymru that professional rugby union allowed the Welsh clubs to resign these star players and cultural figures like Davies, Quinnell and Gibbs all returned to both play rugby union in Wales, and for the national team.

However, Wales continued to perform poorly until Graham Henry was appointed Coach of the National team in 1998. The hope for a Welsh revival, and the cultural aspect of the national team were both evident when Henry was named "The great Redeemer" (an allusion to "Guide me O thou great Redeemer", the opening line of the Welsh hymn Cwm Rhondda). In his first year, Henry led Wales to a then record ten straight victories. Most memorably a first ever win for the Welsh against South Africa and a close victory over England at Wembley.

England at Wembley 

The match was the last ever Five nations game, and Wales' last home game before the Millennium Stadium was complete. BBC Wales had attracted controversy for trailing their coverage of the match with Kelly Jones of the Stereophonics penning a song entitled "As long as We Beat The English." The song was viewed by some as antagonistic or jingoistic, but was praised by others as showing the pride Wales was now displaying in the BBC's "year of Cool Cymru". The build-up to the match also featured Tom Jones and Max Boyce as well as traditional Welsh choirs.

With a much fancied England aiming to complete a Grand Slam, and leading by 6 points with 3 minutes left, Scott Gibbs 'sidestepped' three players for the try, with man of the match Neil Jenkins kicking the conversion to win the match 32-31. Gibbs's try is one of the most celebrated in Welsh history, and was played at many events such as that year's Stereophonics concert at Morfa, Swansea.

World Cup and Millennium Stadium 
With rugby becoming a professional sport in 1995 and Wales winning their bid to host the 1999 World Cup, the Welsh Rugby Union was able to finance redevelopment of the old National Stadium into the Millennium Stadium. The project was completed in June 1999 and foreshadowed more redevelopment in Cardiff and Cardiff Bay. The stadium is seen by many as one of the few lasting legacies of the era of Cool Cymru, and was a major factor in Cardiff's urban renewal. The stadium has contributed between £100m-£135m to the cities economy every year since its construction.

Legacy 
In 2021, Matthew Rhys spoke about his belief that Cool Cymru had a positive impact on the acceptance of the Welsh language, adding that he wished to emulate that affect in his own career.

Notable people and groups

Musical groups 

 Manic Street Preachers
 Stereophonics
 Goldie Lookin Chain
 Super Furry Animals
 Feeder
 Catatonia
 Gorky's Zygotic Mynci
 60ft Dolls
 Mclusky
 Funeral for a Friend
 Melys
 Helen Love
 The Alarm
 Bullet for my Valentine

Solo musicians 

 Cerys Matthews
 Donna Lewis
 Gruff Rhys
 Katherine Jenkins
 Duffy
 Jem
 Tom Jones
 Charlotte Church
 Gwenno Saunders

Record labels 

 Anhrefn Records

Actors and actresses 

 Ioan Gruffudd
 Rhys Ifans
 Anthony Hopkins
 Huw Garmon
 Matthew Rhys
 Catherine Zeta-Jones
 Michael Sheen

Directors 

 Julian Richards

Films 

 Solomon & Gaenor
 August
 Hedd Wyn
 House of America
 Darklands
 Twin Town
 Human Traffic

Sportspeople 

 Joe Calzaghe
 Ryan Giggs
 Scott Gibbs
 Colin Jackson

Authors 

 Howard Marks

Fashion 

 Julien Macdonald

Broadcasters 

 Huw Edwards
 Huw Stephens
 Bethan Elfyn
 Sian Lloyd

See also 

Cool Britannia
British Invasion
Cool Japan
Korean Wave
Taiwanese Wave
Post-Britpop

References 

 
British culture
Welsh culture
Welsh music
1990s fads and trends
1990s in the United Kingdom
1990s in Wales
Welsh-language music
Welsh music history